Maria Östergren (born 9 April 1978) is a Swedish cyclist. She competed in the women's cross-country mountain biking event at the 2004 Summer Olympics.

References

External links
 

1978 births
Living people
Swedish female cyclists
Olympic cyclists of Sweden
Cyclists at the 2004 Summer Olympics
Sportspeople from Stockholm